The Kravica incident can refer to:

Kravica attack (1993): refers to the January 1993 attack by units of the Army of the Republic of Bosnia-Hercegovina based in Srebrenica on Bosnian Serbs positions in Kravica village.
Kravica massacre (1995): refers to the July 1995 executions of Bosniaks (Bosnian Muslim) of Srebrenica by Bosnian Serbs military.